Désiré Munyaneza (born 1966) is a Rwandan businessman and convicted war criminal who was living in Toronto, Ontario, Canada, before being imprisoned.  He is the first man to be arrested and convicted in Canada on charges of war crimes and crimes against humanity, for his role in the 1994 Rwandan Genocide. He was sent to jail in October 2009.

Arrest 
On October 19, 2005, the Royal Canadian Mounted Police announced it had detained Munyaneza under the Crimes Against Humanity and War Crimes Act with charges for two counts of genocide, two counts of crimes against humanity and three counts of war crimes.

Munyaneza was the first person to be arrested under that law, which was passed to give formal recognition to Canada's obligations to the International Criminal Court.

Munyaneza committed the acts near Butare, Rwanda in 1994.

Trial 
Munyaneza's trial began in March 2007 with the testimony of a woman, identified only as witness C-15, who stated that she had pretended to be dead for three days and smeared her sister's blood on her body to hide from Interahamwe gangs.

On April 10, a witness known as C-17 testified that Munyaneza had raped her four times, and that she had witnessed him personally raping and killing others.

On April 11, Munyaneza was severely beaten in his cell at the Rivières-des-Prairies prison by a 17-year-old who had heard about the details of Munyaneza's trial in the media.

On May 22, 2009, Munyaneza, 42 years old, was convicted on seven counts related to genocide, war crimes and crimes against humanity. The offences fall under Canada's Crimes Against Humanity and War Crimes Act, which allows residents to be tried for crimes committed abroad. Munyaneza is the first person to be convicted under the Canadian law. The trial, held in Montreal with the court also travelling to Rwanda, saw sixty-six people testify in court. Many had their identities hidden.

Sentence 
On October 29, 2009, Munyaneza was sentenced to life in prison with no chance of parole for 25 years. Canadian law stated that Munyaneza's criminal activities were the "worst in existence". The judge referred to the sentence as "severe". It is anticipated that Munyaneza will appeal the sentence. Munyaneza's lawyer thought he should be imprisoned for just twenty years. Emmanuel Muhawenimena, who said he lost 70 family members in the genocide, said "So many Rwandans in Montreal, across Canada, all over the world, they are happy today."

References

External links 
R. v. Munyaneza, Quebec Superior Court, 2009 QCCS 2201
Article on Munyaneza at Trial Watch
 GREPIH, Working Group in International Criminal and Humanitarian Law, a student organization of the UQAM which supervises the monitoring of the Munyaneza trial.

1966 births
Living people
Rwandan emigrants to Canada
Rwandan genocide perpetrators
Rwandan people convicted of genocide
Rwandan people convicted of crimes against humanity
Rwandan people convicted of war crimes
Rwandan people imprisoned abroad
Rwandan prisoners sentenced to life imprisonment
Prisoners sentenced to life imprisonment by Canada
Violence against women in Rwanda